Alexander M.M. Uballez is an American lawyer serving as the United States attorney for the District of New Mexico.

Education

Uballez earned a Bachelor of Arts from Pomona College in 2008 and a Juris Doctor from the Columbia University School of Law in 2011.

Career

In 2011, Uballez served as a fellow in the New Jersey State Attorney General's Office. From 2011 to 2012, he served as an assistant district attorney for the First Judicial District Attorney's Office in Santa Fe. From 2012 to 2016, he was an assistant district attorney in the Second Judicial District Attorney's office in Albuquerque. Since 2016, he has served as an assistant United States attorney in the United States Attorney's Office for the District of New Mexico.

U.S. attorney for the District of New Mexico  

On January 26, 2022, President Joe Biden announced his intent to nominate Uballez to be the United States attorney for the District of New Mexico. On January 31, 2022, his nomination was sent to the United States Senate. On May 12, 2022, his nomination was reported out of committee by voice vote. On May 17, 2022, his nomination was confirmed in the Senate by voice vote. He was sworn in on May 24, 2022.

References

External links
 Biography at U.S. Department of Justice

Living people
Year of birth missing (living people)
Place of birth missing (living people)
21st-century American lawyers
Assistant United States Attorneys
Columbia Law School alumni
District attorneys in New Mexico
New Mexico lawyers
Pomona College alumni
United States Attorneys for the District of New Mexico